The Tuscawilla Park Historic District is a historic district in Ocala, Florida. It is bounded by Northeast 4th Street, Sanchez Avenue, 2nd Street, Tuscawilla Avenue, and Watula Street.  It encompasses approximately 20 acres, and contains 37 historic buildings. On March 30, 1988, it was added to the National Register of Historic Places.

See also
United Hebrews of Ocala, a Carpenter Gothic structure built in 1888 at 729 N.E. 2nd street.

References

External links

 Florida's Office of Cultural and Historical Programs - Marion County

Ocala, Florida
National Register of Historic Places in Marion County, Florida
Historic districts on the National Register of Historic Places in Florida